The 1940–41 Toronto Maple Leafs season was the Toronto franchise's 24th season of play.

Offseason
Conn Smythe was making preparations for his eventual tour of duty in Europe. He felt that Dick Irvin would not be strong enough to deal with player issues while he was gone and Smythe convinced the Montreal Canadiens to hire Irvin. Smythe hired Hap Day as coach.

Regular season

Final standings

Record vs. opponents

Schedule and results

Playoffs

The Maple Leafs took on the first-place Boston Bruins in the semi-finals. Boston would win the series four games to three. The Bruins would go on to win the Stanley Cup versus Detroit in four games.

Player statistics

Regular season
Scoring

Goaltending

Playoffs
Scoring

Goaltending

Awards and records

Transactions
May 10, 1940: Traded Murph Chamberlain to the Montreal Canadiens for $7,500
May 10, 1940: Traded Pep Kelly to the Chicago Black Hawks for cash
June 7, 1940: Acquired Frank Eddolls from the Montreal Canadiens for Joe Benoit
July 1, 1940: Acquired Chuck Shannon from the New York Americans for cash
October 20, 1940: Traded Chuck Shannon to the Buffalo Bisons of the AHL for cash
October 22, 1940: Traded Phil Stein to the New Haven Eagles of the AHL for cash
October 31, 1940: Signed Free Agent Nick Knott
January 17, 1941: Acquired Jack Howard and Loan of Peanuts O'Flaherty from the New York Americans for Clarence Drouillard

Farm teams

References
 

Toronto Maple Leafs seasons
Toronto
Toronto